The 2013 Republican National Committee (RNC) chairmanship election was held on January 25, 2013. Then-incumbent RNC Chairman Reince Priebus won re-election with near unanimity in the party's 2013 meeting in Charlotte, North Carolina.

Candidates
Reince Priebus, then-incumbent RNC Chairman 
Mark Willis, National Committeeman from Maine

References

National Committee
Republican National Committee Chairmanship Election, 2013
Republican Party (United States) leadership elections
Republican National Committee chairmanship election